The 1998 New York Attorney General election took place on November 3, 1998 along with elections to the United States Senate in other states as well as elections to the United States House of Representatives and various state and local elections.  Democratic challenger Eliot Spitzer unseated one-term Republican incumbent Dennis Vacco in a major upset.

Democratic primary

Polling

Statewide Results

General election

Polling

Results

References

See also

1998
Attorney General
New York
Eliot Spitzer